The North City Historic District is a U.S. historic district in St. Augustine, Florida. The district is bordered by Castillo Dr. north to Old Mission Ave., N. Ponce de Leon Blvd. on the west and San Marco Avenue on 
the east.

It was added to the National Register of Historic Places on October 1, 2009.

References

National Register of Historic Places in St. Johns County, Florida
Historic districts on the National Register of Historic Places in Florida
St. Augustine, Florida